Dunton is a village and civil parish in the North Norfolk district, in the county of Norfolk, England.

History
Dunton-cum-Doughton's name is of Anglo-Saxon origin and derives from the Old English for a farmstead or settlement either situated on a hill or with ducks.

In the Domesday Book, Dunton is listed as a settlement of 25 households in the hundred of Brothercross. In 1086, the village was part of the East Anglian estates of King William I. The parish of "Dunton" was formed on 1 April 1935 from Dunton cum Doughton, Shereford and Toftrees.

Geography
According to the 2011 Census, Dunton has a population of 126 residents living in 64 households.

Dunton falls within the constituency of Broadland and is represented at Parliament by Jerome Mayhew MP of the Conservative Party.

St. Peter's Church
Dunton's parish church is dedicated to Saint Peter and was largely built in the Fifteenth Century. The church possesses good examples of Nineteenth Century stained glass depicting scenes from the works of mercy installed by Heaton, Butler and Bayne and a depiction of Christ and Mary Magdalene by Ward and Hughes. The glass was severely damaged in 2019 by vandals but has been subsequently repaired. St. Peter's has been unused for church services since the mid-Twentieth Century and is currently in the care of the Norfolk Churches Trust.

War Memorial
Dunton's war memorial takes the form of an engraved brass plaque inside St. Peter's Church. The memorial lists the following names for the First World War:
 Lance-Corporal William H. Beets (1897-1917), Queen's Royal Regiment
 Private Charles Winn (1888-1916), 4th Battalion, Grenadier Guards
 Herbert Brooks
 Charles Jarvis
 Herbert Marshall

Notes

External links

Villages in Norfolk
Civil parishes in Norfolk
North Norfolk